

Television

2020s

2010s

2000s

1990s

1980s

Note 
Keith Magnuson only did color commentary during the 1982 playoffs.

1970s

Note 
As mentioned to up above, Brad Palmer served as the intermission host, while working for WFLD-TV 32 in 1975-76. When the NHL '76 TV series did playoff games, Marv Albert split play-by-play duties with an announcer from one of the participating teams. For instance, on April 18, 1976 (Montreal at Chicago), it was Palmer who split the play-by-play duties with Albert. Albert did play-by-play for the first and third periods while did Palmer the second. Lloyd Pettit of course, was unavailable as he was doing radio (as it turned out for the last time) on WMAQ.

Dan Kelly provided play-by-play for the Black Hawks during the 1978 playoffs. Kelly had become available because St. Louis missed the playoffs. Chicago Tribune beat writer Bob Verdi was the analyst.

1960s

1950s

1940s

Note 
From 1946–49, Joe Wilson called a limited schedule of Sunday home games.

Radio

2020s

2010s

2000s

1990s

1980s

1970s

1960s

1950s

1940s

1930s

Notes 
Bud Kelly frequently filled in for Andy MacWilliams due to MacWilliams suffering from a throat condition.
Keith Magnuson joined the broadcast team after he resigned as head coach. 
Lou Angotti was fired prior to the 1978–79 season, however he was brought back in December 1978.
Although the Blackhawks didn't have a permanent television color commentator from 1967 to 1975, Pettit and West were occasionally joined by WGN personalities including Arne Harris and Lou Boudreau.
ON TV some times showed sports vision games on the ON TV channel and in 1984 sports vision was on TV before the cable and satellite channel started.
Prior to the 2006–07 season, if the game was shown on television, it was simulcast on radio, with the same announcers doing both broadcasts.
In the spring of 1982, Gene Hart announced a Blackhawks/ Vancouver Canucks playoff game on WBBS-TV Chicago alongside Keith Magnuson. WBBS carried the game as Hart announced that the channel would become SportsVision on May 13 that year during a station ID

References

Chicago Blackhawks
 
broadcasters
SportsChannel
Fox Sports Networks
NBC Sports Regional Networks